Kapustka is a Polish language surname. It literally means "cabbage". It may refer to:
 Bartosz Kapustka (born 1996), Polish footballer
 Jozef Kapustka (born 1969), Polish classical pianist
 Kapustka, Russian folk dance

See also
Kapusta (disambiguation)

Polish-language surnames